National Highway 513 (NH 513) is a National Highway in North East India that connects Pasighat and Yingkiong in Arunachal Pradesh. It is a secondary route of National Highway 13. NH-513 runs entirely in the state of Arunachal Pradesh in India.

Route
NH513 connects Passighat, Mariyang  and Yingkiong in the state of Arunachal Pradesh in India.

Junctions  

  Terminal near Passighat.

See also
 List of National Highways in India (by Highway Number)
 National Highways Development Project

References

External links 

 NH 513 on OpenStreetMap

National highways in India
National Highways in Arunachal Pradesh